KLRB (89.9 FM) is a radio station licensed to Stuart, Oklahoma. The station is currently owned by Lighthouse of Prayer, Inc.

History
This station was assigned call sign KLRB on June 22, 2002.

References

External links

LRB
Southern Gospel radio stations in the United States
Radio stations established in 2002